The N1 is a national route in South Africa that runs from Cape Town through Bloemfontein, Johannesburg, Pretoria and Polokwane to Beit Bridge on the border with Zimbabwe. It forms the first section of the famed Cape to Cairo Road.

Prior to 1970, the N1 designation was applied to the route from Beit Bridge to Colesberg and then along the current N9 to George. The section from Cape Town to Colesberg was designated the N9.

Route

Western Cape 

The N1 begins in central Cape Town at the northern end of Buitengracht Street (M62), outside the entrance to the Victoria & Alfred Waterfront. The first section of the N1 is shared with the beginning of the N2; it is a four-lane elevated freeway that runs along a strip of land between the city centre and the Port of Cape Town. On the eastern edge of the city centre the two roads split, and the N1 turns east as Table Bay Boulevard, passing the Ysterplaat Air Force Base and Century City before the N7 intersects it on its own way out of the city towards Namibia. Major improvements have been made to the Koeberg Interchange, where the N1 meets the M5, one of the main arterial routes linking Milnerton with the Southern Suburbs.

The N1 then heads through the suburbs of Goodwood and Bellville, where the R300 terminates at it, before heading towards Paarl. At Paarl, the freeway ends, and the N1 is tolled as it passes through the Huguenot Tunnel running underneath the Du Toitskloof Mountains; the tunnel was opened in the late 1980s to replace the old Du Toitskloof Pass running over the mountain, with the old route over the pass designated as the R101. After emerging from the tunnel, the N1 winds through the Molenaar River Valley (which is a short dual carriageway section) before emerging from the valley and heading towards Worcester, bypassing Rawsonville. From Worcester, the route heads through the Hex River Valley, passing De Doorns and then enters the Karoo by ascending the Hex River Pass en route to Touws River.

Currently only the section of the N1 passing through the Huguenot Tunnel is tolled, although there were formerly plans to toll the N1 from the junction with the R300, roughly to De Doorns. This would have allowed for upgrading of the N1, most especially the opening and construction of the Northern Bore of the Huguenot Tunnel so that two lanes of traffic could pass in each direction through the tunnel, and the building of grade separated junctions along the N1 through Worcester. Although the town centre is bypassed, there are a number of traffic lights on the N1 through Worcester.

From the top of the pass, the N1 passes Touws River and Matjiesfontein before passing through Laingsburg, then heads towards Beaufort West, passing the ghost towns of Prince Albert Road and Leeu-Gamka. The 200 km section between Laingsburg and Beaufort West is notorious for claiming many lives in fatigue-related accidents; also, the N1 begins to turn towards the north-east along this stretch of road. Just before Beaufort West, the N12 from George meets the N1; the N12 and the N1 routes are co-signed through Beaufort West and for the next 75 km north-east before splitting at Three Sisters. The N12 later meets the N1 again in Johannesburg, making the N12 an alternative route to the N1, passing through Kimberley as opposed to Bloemfontein. The N1 from Bloemfontein northwards is tolled while the N12 is toll-free. Whereas the N12 also passes through most of the towns en route to Johannesburg, the N1 bypasses every town between Beaufort West and Johannesburg (avoiding town centres).

The N1 briefly crosses into the Northern Cape at Three Sisters for a few kilometres before crossing back into the Western Cape, and remains in the Western Cape until just after its intersection with the R63, where it re-enters the Northern Cape.

Northern Cape 
The N1 has a short section in the Northern Cape. After re-entering the Northern Cape, it passes north-east past the town of Richmond before intersecting with the N10 at Hanover, which is the halfway point between Johannesburg and Cape Town. The N1 then continues towards Colesberg, where it meets the northern terminus of the N9 just south-west of the town. Approximately 35km after Colesberg, the N1 crosses the Orange River and enters the Free State.

Free State 
After the Orange River crossing, the N1 makes a direct line for Bloemfontein, passing the towns of Springfontein, Trompsburg and Edenburg, heading in a more northerly direction. The N1 from Colesberg to Bloemfontein is highly significant because it was the first single-carriageway freeway built in South Africa. The bridges with the interchanges at Trompsburg and Edenburg show the ambitious plans for this road as a dual-carriage freeway. Upon entering Bloemfontein, the N1 meets the northern terminus of the N6 from East London. This intersection marks the beginning of the Bloemfontein Western Bypass, which is the first freeway section on the route since Paarl. The N8 from Kimberley in the west intersects with the N1 bypass, joining it for 3 km, before heading east through the Bloemfontein CBD and then to Maseru in Lesotho.

The N1 is designated as a toll road from the N6 interchange until its end at Beit Bridge. A few kilometres north of Bloemfontein, the N1 meets the R30 to Brandfort; the N1 continues as a single carriageway but with two lanes in each direction until 5 km before the toll plaza at Verkeerdevlei, halfway between Bloemfontein and Winburg. Initial plans were for the N1 from Bloemfontein to Winburg to be a dual-carriageway freeway. At Winburg, the N1 bypasses the town to the west as a dual carriageway and meets the western terminus of the N5, which bypasses the north of Lesotho before its own termination at the N3 in Harrismith. Just after Winburg, the N1 becomes a single carriageway again.

Many motorists from Cape Town heading for Durban travel the N1 to Winburg, and then N5 to Harrismith as an alternative to reach Durban via N3. This is due to the shorter distance between the two cities (1635 km for the N1, N5 & N3 route and 1710 km for the current N2 route), as well as the much better quality of this route compared with the N2, especially between Port Shepstone and Grahamstown (although that stretch of road has been improved in the past few years). However, after the new N2 Wild Coast Toll Route has been completed, the N2 will be the shorter road between Durban and Cape Town (1621 km).

The N1 continues north and bypasses Ventersburg, where it becomes a dual carriageway again, before reaching Kroonstad. There, the R34 from Welkom joins the N1 freeway for 9 kilometres, bypassing Kroonstad Central to the east, before splitting from the N1 and making its own way towards Heilbron.

After the dual carriageway freeway bypass of Kroonstad, the N1 returns to single carriageway status and heads towards the Vaal River and Gauteng as the Kroonvaal Toll Route. Just before passing into Gauteng at the Vaal River, the N1 becomes a dual-carriageway freeway and features another toll plaza (the Vaal Toll Plaza) just south of its major interchange with the R59 road, which provides access to the Vaal Triangle (Vereeniging and Sasolburg) in the east and Parys in the west.

Gauteng 
After crossing the Vaal River, the N1 continues towards Johannesburg, bypassing Vanderbijlpark and featuring another toll plaza at Grasmere. At the Misgund Interchange in the southern outskirts of Johannesburg, the N12 once again meets the N1, and they are co-signed northwards as one highway for 4 kilometers (bypassing Soweto) up to the Diepkloof Interchange, where the N12 splits off eastwards to become the Southern Bypass portion of the Johannesburg Ring Road. From just north of the Vaal River the N1 changes from being a tarred road to a concrete road, until just after meeting the N12. The R553 road off-ramp just before the Diepkloof Interchange marks the beginning of the N1 being an e-toll highway (with open road tolling).

The N1 then becomes the Western Bypass portion of the same ring road, passing through Johannesburg's western and north-western suburbs (forming Roodepoort's eastern boundary and passing through Randburg) before meeting the N3 (the Eastern Bypass portion of the Johannesburg Ring Road, which connects to Durban) and Johannesburg's own M1 freeway at the Buccleuch Interchange north-east of Sandton.

The N1 then becomes the Ben Schoeman Highway, heading northwards towards Pretoria (Passing through Midrand); this section carries 300,000 vehicles per day and is purported to be the busiest stretch of road in South Africa. At the Brakfontein Interchange in Centurion, the N1 meets the N14 and they switch highways, with the N14 becoming the Ben Schoeman Highway northwards to Pretoria Central and the N1 becoming the Pretoria Eastern Bypass (named the Danie Joubert Freeway) towards the north-east, proceeding to intersect with the R21 Highway from O. R. Tambo International Airport at the Flying Saucer Interchange before Pretoria East. After the R21 interchange, the N1 proceeds in a more northerly direction through the eastern suburbs. East of Pretoria CBD, at the Proefplaas Interchange, the N4 National Route from Witbank in the east joins the N1 and they are one highway for a short distance northwards (12 km) before the N4 splits off to the west (named the Platinum Highway) towards Rustenburg.

The Proefplaas Interchange east of Pretoria Central marks the end of the N1 being an e-toll highway (it returns to having tollgates on the road). At the Rustenburg turn-off (interchange with the N4 Platinum Highway) is the Pumulani Toll Plaza on the N1 north and the Doornpoort Toll Plaza on the N4 west.

From the interchange with the N4 (Rustenburg turn-off), the N1 is tolled for the remainder of its length, with various toll plazas located along it (Including upon off-ramps). The N1 then heads to the north, bypassing Hammanskraal, and crosses into the Limpopo province.

Limpopo 
The N1 then passes near Bela-Bela (previously Warmbaths) and Modimolle (previously Nylstroom). At the Modimolle exit, the freeway ends; the section of freeway between the Vaal River and Modimolle is the longest freeway in South Africa by route number at approximately 265 km (although there are two changes in the alignment of freeway in Gauteng, at the Buccleuch and Brakfontein Interchanges; South Africa's longest continuous freeway is the N3 between Durban and Ladysmith, which is approximately 20 km shorter). The section from the Proefplaas Interchange in Pretoria to the Bela Bela exit is maintained by a private concessionaire, namely Bakwena, under license from SANRAL.

The N1 then heads past Mokopane (previously Potgietersrus), where the N11 intersects it at the Nyl Toll Plaza (north off-ramp only) (leaving the N18 and the N17 as the only national roads that do not intersect with the N1), before heading to Polokwane (previously known as Pietersburg). The Polokwane Eastern Bypass is now used by traffic to loop around the Polokwane Town Centre (the N1 is no-longer the road passing through the town centre).

After Polokwane, the N1 heads north, crossing the Tropic of Capricorn before passing Louis Trichardt. The N1 then winds through the Soutpansberg Mountains (containing two short tunnels) as the Wyllie's Poort Pass before heading to Musina (passing the last tollgate before Musina). The Musina Western Bypass is now used by traffic to bypass the CBD to the west (The N1 is no-longer the road passing through the town centre). The route then continues for 12 km to end at the Beit Bridge border crossing with Zimbabwe on the Limpopo River, where it crosses the river as the Alfred Beit Road Bridge and becomes the A4 road to Harare. The border on the other side of the Limpopo River is also called Beitbridge.

Junctions

Trans-African Highway Network

The section of the N1 from Cape Town to the split with the N12 National Route at Three Sisters, Northern Cape is declared part of the Trans-African Highway Network no. 4 or Cairo-Cape Town Highway, which is the route designated by the United Nations Economic Commission for Africa between Cairo and Cape Town. (The route continues as the N12 northwards from Three Sisters)

Old Route

In numerous places in South Africa, specifically near major cities, the N1 route has been rebuilt to freeway standards. The original routes usually carry the designation of R101 and are often alternative routes to the newer, sometimes tolled, highways. Two examples are the R101 over Du Toitskloof Pass, where the new N1 highway bypasses the pass altogether by use of the Huguenot Tunnel, and the R101 through Polokwane Central, where the new N1 highway bypasses the town centre by use of the Polokwane Eastern Bypass.

There are exceptions to the usual R101 alternative route designation:

 The old N1 route from Colesberg to Bloemfontein is designated R717 up until Reddersburg, where it's designated N6 to Bloemfontein.
 The old N1 route through Bloemfontein is designated as the M30.
 Between Bloemfontein and Winburg, the old route is designated firstly as the R30 between Bloemfontein and Brandfort and then is not designated to Winburg.
 Between Kroonstad and Parys, the old route is designated firstly as the R721 from Kroonstad to Vredefort and then as the R59 through Parys to the interchange with the N1 at the Vaal Toll Plaza, approximately 10 km south of the Vaal River.
 Between the Vaal River and Johannesburg, several alternative routes exist, the official alternative route being via the Golden Highway (R553). The old N1 route however followed the designation of the R42 through Vanderbijlpark to Vereeniging, and then the R82 leading to Johannesburg's M1 freeway. The M1 as well as Old Pretoria Road and Louis Botha Avenue (together designated as the M11 Road) provide the alternative route through Johannesburg; near the Buccleuch Interchange (the point where the N1, M1 and N3 converge), the M11 becomes the R101, providing the alternative route through to Polokwane via Midrand, Centurion, Pretoria, Bela-Bela, Modimolle & Mokopane.

Tolls

The list below only includes mainline toll plazas; e-Toll between Johannesburg and Pretoria, and ramp toll plazas have not been included.

References

External links

 National Roads Agency SA

 
National Roads in South Africa
Roads in Cape Town
Streets and roads of Johannesburg
Toll roads in South Africa
Highways in South Africa
Roads in South Africa